Neftochimic is a Bulgarian professional association football club based in Burgas, which currently competes in B RFG Burgas, the fifth tier of the Bulgarian football league system, after being disqualified for financial problems in 2021 from the Second League and reformed in 2022. The team plays its home games at the local Lazur Stadium, which it used to share with PSFC Chernomorets Burgas up until 2015.

Club colours

Kit history

History

Ancestors

PFC Neftochimic Burgas

 On 6 July 2009, Naftex Burgas stopped its existence. On 7 July the amateur football club Athletic was renamed to Neftochimic 1986 and was subsequently declared by the owners as a successor of the old team. During the following 2010–11 season the team finished second, completing a quick return to professional football. On 27 June 2014 it was announced that the club was dissolved due to financial debts.

Neftochimic also won the 2011 Bulgarian Amateur Football League Cup.

Master Burgas/PFC Burgas

The club was founded in 2009 as Football Club Master. On 19 June 2014, the BFU confirmed Benkovski Byala's withdrawal from the 2014–15 B PFG and officially invited Master Burgas to take their spot as the 2nd placed team in the Southeast V AFG.

On 22 June, the club announced it has accepted the invitation, and in addition will change its name to PFC Burgas and switch colors from red and white to blue and white, similar to the flag of Burgas.

The New Neftochimic (2015–present)

Professional divisions (2015–present)
On 7 January 2015, it's announced that PFC Burgas and the newly establish team SNC Neftochimic Burgas, claiming to be successor of PFC Neftochimic Burgas (2009–14), are going to merge in the end of the season and start the next season under the name PFC Neftochimic Burgas 1962. Neftochimic Burgas 1962 started the 2015–16 season in B Group on the place of PFC Burgas. The team finished 12th, but was administratively promoted to the new Bulgarian First League.

On 3 June 2017, the team lost the playoff match against Vitosha Bistritsa and was relegated from the Bulgarian First League. On 23 June 2017, the team announced that they will play mostly with youth team players due to financial troubles and so most of U19 team were promoted to first team with Nikolay Krastev as manager and Stanislav Zhekov as his assistant, while most of the players from last season would be released.

Relegation and Third Division (2018-2019)

On 15 August 2017, it was announced that Lokomotiv Burgas would merge with the team, making Sutherland Global Services the new owners of the team. The 2017–18 season was very poor for "the Sheikhs", as they won only 2 games in the Second League, and were relegated to the third tier, the Third Amateur Football League. 

In the new season Neftochimic managed to win a promotion back to Second League, finishing 1st, after dominating the league with 29 wins, 3 draws and just 2 losses. They managed to defeat city rivals FC Chernomorets 1919 Burgas on two occasions.

Back to Second Division (2019-present)

In their first season back with the professionals, Neftochimic managed to finish 5th, just before the league was stopped due to the COVID-19 pandemic just 9 points behind the 3rd in the league Montana who were granted promotion. "The Sheikhs"  started the season playing their home games Arena Sozopol, due to the lack of financial support. In their first home game Neftochimic managed to defeat their long time rivals FC Spartak Varna with a 5:0 win.

On 22 November 2019 Neftochimic signed a 5-year sponsorship deal with Bulgarian betting company "efbet", which made a financial agreement with Stadion Lazur's owner Mitko Sabev to bring the club back to its original home, renaming and re-branding it to "Efbet Arena Burgas".

Current squad

Players 

For recent transfers, see Transfers summer 2021.

Managers

League positions

Past seasons

Goalscoring and appearance records

External links
Official website
BGclubs

References

1962 establishments in Bulgaria
Association football clubs established in 1962
Neftochimic Burgas